SSTAR may refer to:

 Society for Sex Therapy and Research
 Small, sealed, transportable, autonomous reactor
 Sstar, an IBM processor within the RS64 line